Alexander Fletcher was the  speaker of Legislative Assembly of Prince Edward Island from 1785 to 1787. He was re-elected speaker in the year 1790.

References

Speakers of the Legislative Assembly of Prince Edward Island
Members of the Legislative Council of Prince Edward Island
18th-century Canadian politicians
Year of birth uncertain
Year of death uncertain
Colony of Prince Edward Island people